Charles Burnham "Bud" Wilkinson (April 23, 1916 – February 9, 1994) was an American football player, coach, broadcaster, and politician. He served as the head football coach at the University of Oklahoma from 1947 to 1963, compiling a record of 145–29–4. His Oklahoma Sooners won three national championships (1950, 1955, and 1956) and 14 conference titles. Between 1953 and 1957, Wilkinson's Oklahoma squads won 47 straight games, a record that still stands at the highest level of college football. After retiring from coaching following the 1963 season, Wilkinson entered into politics and, in 1965, became a broadcaster with ABC Sports. He returned to coaching in 1978, helming the St. Louis Cardinals of the National Football League (NFL) for two seasons. Wilkinson was inducted into the College Football Hall of Fame as a coach in 1969.

Early life and playing career
Wilkinson's mother died when he was seven, and his father sent him to the Shattuck School in Faribault, Minnesota, where he excelled in five sports and graduated in 1933. He enrolled at the University of Minnesota, where, as a guard and quarterback for head coach Bernie Bierman, Wilkinson helped lead the Golden Gophers to three consecutive national championships from 1934 to 1936. He also played ice hockey for the University of Minnesota. Following his graduation in 1937 with a degree in English, he led the College All-Stars to a 6–0 victory over the defending NFL champion Green Bay Packers in Chicago on August 31.

Coaching career
Wilkinson briefly worked for his father's mortgage company, then he became an assistant coach at Syracuse University and later at his alma mater, Minnesota. In 1943, he joined the U.S. Navy, where he was an assistant to Don Faurot with the Iowa Pre-Flight Seahawks football team. Following World War II, Jim Tatum, the new head coach at the University of Oklahoma, persuaded Wilkinson to join his staff in 1946. After one season in Norman, Tatum left the Sooners for the University of Maryland. The 31-year-old Wilkinson was named head football coach and athletic director of the Sooners.

Head coach at Oklahoma
In his first season as head coach in 1947, Wilkinson led Oklahoma to a 7–2–1 record and a share of the conference championship, the first of 13 consecutive Big Six/Seven/Eight Conference titles. Ultimately, Wilkinson became one of the most celebrated college coaches of all time. His teams captured national championships in 1950, 1955, and 1956, and they amassed a 145–29–4 (.826) overall record. He got OU football placed on major NCAA probation twice in a five year span (1955 and 1960) for illegally paying players out of a $125,000 slush fund for a decade and a half after World War II ended.

The centerpiece of his time in Norman was a 47-game winning streak from 1953 to 1957, an NCAA Division I record that still stands. It has been moderately threatened only four times: by North Dakota State in Division I FCS (39 wins, 2017–2021), Toledo (35 wins, 1969–1971), Miami (FL) (34 wins, 2000–2003), and USC (34 wins, 2003–2005). Earlier, the Sooners ran off 31 consecutive wins from 1948 to 1950. Apart from two losses in 1951, Wilkinson's Sooners did not lose more than one game per season for 11 years between 1948 and 1958, going 107–8–2 over that period. His teams also went 12 consecutive seasons (1947–1958) without a loss in conference play, a streak which has never been seriously threatened. Wilkinson did not suffer his first conference loss until 1959 against Nebraska, his 79th conference game.

Wilkinson suffered only one losing season, in 1960. However, that season saw him pass Bennie Owen to become the winningest coach in Sooner history. He has since been passed by Barry Switzer and Bob Stoops.

While coaching at OU, Wilkinson began writing a weekly newsletter to alumni during the season, to keep them interested in Sooner football. He also became the first football coach to host his own television show. He and Michigan State University coach Duffy Daugherty partnered to sponsor a series of clinics for high school coaches nationwide. Later, they turned their clinics into a profitable business.

Following the 1963 season, his 17th at Oklahoma, Wilkinson retired from coaching at the age of 47. Along with Owen, Switzer and Stoops, he is one of four football coaches to win over 100 games at the University of Oklahoma. No other college football program has had more than three coaches who accomplished the feat.

President's Council on Physical Fitness

While at Oklahoma, Wilkinson served on the President's Council on Physical Fitness from 1961 to 1964. He designed 11 floor exercises for schoolchildren that were incorporated into the song "Chicken Fat", the theme song for President John F. Kennedy's youth fitness program, which was widely used in school gymnasiums across the country in the 1960s and 1970s.

Later life and career

Politics

In February, 1964, Wilkinson announced that he would enter a special election to replace his friend, the late Robert S. Kerr, as U. S. Senator from Oklahoma. He had already resigned his position as head coach of the Oklahoma University Sooners.   Politicians and the Oklahoma press debated whether he was qualified to become a U. S. Senator, though all seemed to agree that his popularity as a cultural icon gave him an important edge. Easily winning the Republican primary, Wilkinson became the Republican nominee for the U.S. Senate in 1964, at which point he legally changed his first name to Bud, but narrowly lost to Democrat Fred R. Harris, then a State Senator in Oklahoma. Both parties involved political heavyweights from out of state to campaign for their candidates. Republicans invited former President Eisenhower and Senator Barry Goldwater. Illness made Eisenhower miss the occasion, so his former Vice President Richard Nixon served as substitute. Harris supporters got President Lyndon Johnson to make an appearance, as well as several other national Democrats. Wilkinson's Republican advisers brought in Senator Strom Thurmond to appeal to ultra-conservative voters in Little Dixie, which had recently turned reliably Republican. That effort backfired. Harris later said, "my campaign got an extra benefit from Senator Thurmond's Oklahoma visit … Thurmond wound up scaring the daylights out of even a lot of conservative white voters with his jingoist speeches, advocating for the escalation of the American war effort in Vietnam." In the 1964 General Election, Republican presidential nominee, Senator Barry Goldwater lost to incumbent President Lyndon Baines Johnson 55-45 percent in Oklahoma. Through 2020, Johnson is the last Democrat to carry Oklahoma in a presidential election. Wilkinson entertained seeking the other Oklahoma U.S. Senate seat in 1968, but he did not run, and the position went to former Governor Henry Bellmon, also a Republican.

Broadcasting and NFL coaching
In 1965, Wilkinson joined ABC Sports as their lead color commentator on college football telecasts, teaming with Chris Schenkel and, later, Keith Jackson.  Wilkinson was the color analyst for four of the greatest games in college football history, each commonly referred to as a "Game of the Century": Notre Dame vs. Michigan State in 1966, UCLA vs. USC in 1967, Texas vs. Arkansas in 1969, and Nebraska vs. Oklahoma in 1971.

Wilkinson was inducted into the College Football Hall of Fame in 1969.

In 1975, he received the Golden Plate Award of the American Academy of Achievement.

In 1978, Wilkinson returned to coaching with the St. Louis Cardinals of the NFL. After less than two disappointing seasons, he was fired, and returned to broadcasting with ESPN.

Death
Wilkinson suffered a series of minor strokes and, on February 9, 1994, he died of congestive heart failure in St. Louis at the age of 77. He is interred at Oak Grove Cemetery in St. Louis, Missouri.

Personal life
Wilkinson was married to the former Mary Schifflet in 1938, with whom he had two sons, Pat and Jay. They divorced in 1975. A year later, he married Donna O'Donnahue, 33 years his junior, who survived him in death.

Head coaching record

College

NFL

Notes

See also
 Oklahoma drill

References

External links
 
 
 
 Voices of Oklahoma interview with Jay Wilkinson First person interview conducted on February 9, 2012, with Jay Wilkinson about his father, Bud Wilkinson.

1916 births
1994 deaths
American football quarterbacks
Coaches of American football from Minnesota
College football announcers
College Football Hall of Fame inductees
Iowa Pre-Flight Seahawks football coaches
Minnesota Golden Gophers football coaches
Minnesota Golden Gophers football players
Minnesota Golden Gophers men's ice hockey players
Oklahoma Republicans
Oklahoma Sooners athletic directors
Oklahoma Sooners football coaches
Psi Upsilon
Players of American football from Minneapolis
Sports coaches from Minneapolis
St. Louis Cardinals (football) head coaches
Syracuse Orange football coaches
United States Navy officers
United States Navy personnel of World War II